MC is an initialism for master of ceremonies.

MC, M.C., Mc, mC or mc may also refer to:

Places
 Macau, a Chinese territory (FIPS country code)
 Monaco (ISO 3166-1 alpha-2 country code MC)

People
 MC (singer), Hong Kong singer
 Mc-, a Gaelic surname prefix of Mac-, meaning son, prefixed to Scottish and Irish names
 MC, pseudonym of the Korean StarCraft II player Jang Min Chul
 M.C., pseudonym of the Australian novelist Catherine Edith Macauley Martin

Arts, entertainment, and media

Gaming 
 Minecraft, a sandbox game made by Mojang

Television
 Mayans M.C., a television series spun off from Sons of Anarchy, about the fictional Mayans Motorcycle Club
 Multicinema, a Mexican pay TV network

Other arts, music, entertainment, and media
 Master of ceremonies or mistress of ceremonies
 MCing: Alternative term for rapping
 mc die microcomputer-zeitschrift (magazine), former German computer magazine
 Music Canada, a non-profit trade organization for companies that record, manufacture, produce, and distribute music in Canada
 Music Choice, cable television channel

Businesses and organizations
 LVMH (pan-European stock exchange stock symbol MC)
 Missionaries of Charity, whose members use the post-nominal letters MC
 Motorcycle club

Education
 Marin Catholic High School, Kentfield, Marin County, California, US (San Francisco Bay Area)
 Marietta College, Marietta, Ohio, US
 Master of Counselling, an academic degree
 Michigan Collegiate, Warren, Michigan, US (Detroit area)
 Middlebury College, Middlebury, Vermont, US
 Mission College (California), Santa Clara, California, US (San Francisco Bay Area)
 Mississippi College, Clinton, Mississippi, US (Jackson, Mississippi area)
 Montgomery College, Montgomery County, Maryland, US (Washington, DC area)
 Montgomery College (now Lone Star College-Montgomery), Montgomery County, Texas, US (Houston area)
 Multiple choice, a form of an objective assessment

Military
 Mass communication specialist, a US Navy rating
 Military Cross, a British and Commonwealth military decoration

Science and technology

Astrophysics and astrology
 Mars Chart, see List of quadrangles on Mars
 Medium Coeli, midheaven point in astrology

Computing and technology
 .mc, the Internet country code top-level domain (ccTLD) for Monaco
 Music Cassette - cassette tape, e.g. C60 or C90 for up to 120 minutes of recordings
 Microcassette tape, e.g. MC30 is 30-minute tape
 Microcontroller (abbreviated "MC", "MCU" or "μC"), a computer-on-a-chip used to control electronic devices
 Midnight Commander, a file-management software
 Moving coil, a type of phonograph magnetic cartridge

Other uses in science and technology
 Moscovium, symbol Mc, a chemical element
 Megacoulomb, an SI unit of electric charge
 Micro- (mc), alternative to SI prefix μ, e.g. mcg
 Microchimerism, the presence of a minority of extrinsic living cells in a host
 Millicoulomb (mC), an SI unit of electric charge
 Dichloromethane (CH2Cl2, Methylene Cloride (MC) or DCM), a chemical compound

Other uses
 "Mc-", a prefix used to form McWords
 Marginal cost, in economics and finance
 Metro Cebu, the urban center of Cebu, Philippines
 Middle Chinese, an historical Chinese dialect
 1100 in Roman numerals

See also
 CM (disambiguation)
 Mac (disambiguation)
 MCMC (disambiguation)
 Mic (disambiguation)